Robert McLean Boyd Jr. (July 29, 1955 – February 21, 2011) was an American professional golfer.

Boyd was born in Mount Olive, North Carolina. He played his college golf at (and graduated from) the University of Maryland. He turned professional in 1977.

Boyd spent 1983 and 1984 on the PGA Tour. His best finish was a T-6 at the 1983 Houston Coca-Cola Open. He also played a handful of tournaments on the Nationwide Tour where his best finish was a T-4 at the 1996 NIKE Carolina Classic.

Boyd also played on the European Seniors Tour from 2005 to 2010. He had won the Castellon Costa Azahar Open de España in 2005.

Professional wins (19)

Other wins (18)
this list may be incomplete
1982 Carolinas Open
1984 Carolinas PGA Championship
1985 South Carolina Open
1988 PGA Club Professional Championship
1989 South Carolina Open, Carolinas Open, Carolinas PGA Championship
1990 Maryland Open
1992 South Carolina Open
1993 South Carolina Open, Carolinas Open, Carolinas PGA Championship
1994 South Carolina Open, Carolinas PGA Championship
1995 North Carolina Open
1999 Carolinas Open
2000 North Carolina Open
2004 North Carolina Open

European Senior Tour wins (1)

European Senior Tour playoff record (0–2)

Results in major championships

Note: Boyd never played in the Masters Tournament nor The Open Championship.

CUT = missed the half-way cut
"T" = tied

Other achievements
7-time Carolina PGA Player of the Year
22-time Carolina PGA section major winner

U.S. national team appearances
PGA Cup: 1990 (winners), 2000 (winners)

See also
1982 PGA Tour Qualifying School graduates

References

External links

American male golfers
Maryland Terrapins men's golfers
PGA Tour golfers
European Senior Tour golfers
Golfers from North Carolina
People from Mount Olive, North Carolina
1955 births
2011 deaths